This is a list of women writers who were born in Bolivia or whose writings are closely associated with that country.

A
Diego Aramburo (born 1971), actress, director, and playwright
Beatriz Azurduy Palacios (1952–2003), film director, screenwriter, non-fiction writer

B
Yolanda Bedregal (1916–1999), poet, novelist
Nadezhda Bravo Cladera (born 1944), linguist, writer, educator

C
Teresa Gisbert Carbonell (1926–2018), architect, art historian, non-fiction writer
Matilde Casazola (born 1942), poet, songwriter
Carola Cobo (1909–2003), writer, theater and radio artist
María Guadalupe Cuenca (1790–1854), letter writer
Silvia Rivera Cusicanqui (born 1949), Aymara feminist sociologist

F
Hercilia Fernández de Mujía (1860–1929), poet and writer

G
María Galindo (born 1964), lesbian activist, psychologist, non-fiction writer

M
Rosa Julieta Montaño Salvatierra (born 1946), attorney, activist, non-fiction writer
María Josefa Mujía (1812–1888), poet, Bolivia's first woman writer
Hilda Mundy (1912–1980), writer, poet, journalist

R
Giovanna Rivero (born 1972), novelist, short story writer, educator
Ana María Romero de Campero (1941–2010), politician, journalist, non-fiction writer

T
Lola Taborga de Requena (1890–c.1950), modernist poet
Ana Rosa Tornero (1907–1984), journalist, editor, women's rights activist

U
Julia Urquidi (1926–2010), memoirist

V
Etelvina Villanueva y Saavedra (1897–1969), poet, educator, feminist

W
Blanca Wiethüchter (1947–2004), poet, short story writer, novelist, essayist

Z
Adela Zamudio (1854–1928), acclaimed poet, feminist, educator

See also
List of women writers
List of Spanish-language authors

-
Bolivian women writers, List of
Women writers, List of Bolivian